The Bachelor, also called HaRavak, is a reality show broadcast on Israeli Channel 10 from December 2009. The program is based on the American format of The Bachelor first aired in 2002 on ABC.

Format
Each season, there is one single man (the "Bachelor") and a group of single women who are collectively competing for his heart (the "contestants"). The season takes place over a series of episodes where the Bachelor embarks on various dates and romantic getaways with the contestants as he determines his compatibility with each of them. Along the way, the Bachelor will eliminate contestants until he narrows down the playing field to two eligible candidates. At this point, the Bachelor will decide the winner, and they continue together in a relationship.

In the first season of the show, the bachelor was Guy Geyor, who previously participated in the second season of Survivor (Israeli TV series). At the end of the season, he chose contestant Daphne de Groot. The second season of the show began airing on June 12, 2013 with the singer Dudu Aharon as the Bachelor looking for his fiancée. The final program was broadcast on 29 August 2013 with Aharon selecting challenger Danino. Shortly after the final broadcast the two announced that they had separated.

First season
First season bachelor faced "Survivor" Guy Geyor. This season choose the bachelor contestants Daphne de Groot.

Contestants
Hdhtn order:
Viktory Otnakov
Maya Chen
Yael Bar
Michal Bar
Meitar David
Katya Bar
Liat Frodzon
Hilla Daddy
Karin Shmir
Malayan Melis
Noa Bik
Yael Levy
Yasmin Swisa
Valeri Dan
Natali Turgeman
Daphne de groot (Winner)

Second season
The second season is unmarried singer Dudu Aharon. This season, unlike last season, had a light and humorous atmosphere more and carried the slogan "must marry his cousin." This season choose the bachelor contestants planted Danino couple Separate shortly after the show airs.

Contestants
Shiran Izenkot
Liraz Ben dahan
Batel Tavori
Karin Cohen 
Hodaya Sassoon
Inbal Amirav 
Chen Ohana
Anael Kor
Karmit Siani
Lapid Sidler
Noa Hoyo
Liron Golan
Neta Danino (Winner)

References

Israeli reality television series
2009 Israeli television series debuts
2000s Israeli television series
2013 Israeli television series endings